This is the complete list of number-one singles in Turkey in 2010 according to the Nielsen Music Control.

Chart history

References

External links
 Official Twitter page of MusicTopTR
 Official Facebook page of MusicTop TR

Number-one songs
Turkish Top 20 Chart
2010s